"Trip at the Brain" is a song by American crossover thrash band Suicidal Tendencies. It is the first track on their 1988 third album How Will I Laugh Tomorrow When I Can't Even Smile Today and was the album's first single. It is also the first track on the 2010 compilation album Playlist: The Very Best of Suicidal Tendencies, which was not endorsed by the band.

Music video
The music video for the song was directed by Bill Fishman, who received heavy rotation on MTV. After the scientist finds a brain from a waste can, he says "there's nothing wrong with this brain". While the scientist hypnotizes Mike Muir with it tied with chains, Muir ends up through his whole mind and John Cusack made a cameo.

Covers
This song was covered by the Danish death/thrash metal band Hatesphere in their 2005 EP The Killing.

References 

1988 singles
Suicidal Tendencies songs
1988 songs
Epic Records singles
Songs written by Mike Muir